Ramón "Mike" Herrera [er-ray'-ra] (December 19, 1897 – February 3, 1978) was an infielder in Major League Baseball, playing mainly as a second baseman for the Boston Red Sox in part of two seasons. Listed at 5' 6", 147 lb., Herrera batted and threw right-handed. He was born in Havana, Cuba.
 
Long before Jackie Robinson and Larry Doby, Herrera was one of the first men to play in both the major leagues (1925-1926) and the Negro leagues (1915-1928). He played for the Cuban Stars (West) of the Negro National League in 1920 and 1921, and for the Cuban Stars (East) of the Eastern Colored League in 1928. He joined the Boston Red Sox in September 1925, appearing in 10 games while hitting a .385 batting average, but he hit only .257 in 74 games in 1926.

In a two-season major league career, Herrera was a .275 hitter (76-for-276) with 22 runs and 27 RBI in 84 appearances, including 14 doubles, one triple, and one stolen base. He did not hit a home run.

Herrera also played for many seasons in the Cuban Winter League.

He was enshrined in the Cuban Baseball Hall of Fame in 1963. He died in his homeland of Havana, Cuba at age 80.

External links
 and Seamheads
Cuban Baseball Hall of Fame

1897 births
1978 deaths
Baseball players from Havana
Almendares (baseball) players
Boston Red Sox players
Club Fé players
Cuban Stars (East) players
Cuban Stars (West) players
Habana players
Long Branch Cubans players
Major League Baseball second basemen
Major League Baseball players from Cuba
Cuban expatriate baseball players in the United States